Kelso is an unincorporated community in Lincoln County, Tennessee, United States. Kelso has a post office with ZIP code 37348. The community is home to the original Benjamin Prichard's distillery.

References

Unincorporated communities in Lincoln County, Tennessee
Unincorporated communities in Tennessee